Michel Meyer (born 3 December 1936) is a French sprint canoeist, born in Paris, who competed in the late 1950s and early 1960s. Competing in two Summer Olympics, he earned his best finish of fifth in the K-2 1000 m event at Melbourne in 1956.

References
Sports-reference.com profile

1936 births
Canoeists at the 1956 Summer Olympics
Canoeists at the 1960 Summer Olympics
French male canoeists
Living people
Olympic canoeists of France
Sportspeople from Paris